Kijal Bypass, Federal Route 145 and 146, is a major highway bypass in Kemaman district, Terengganu, Malaysia. Route  has a length of 15.70.  has a length of 1.79 km.

The Kilometre Zero of the Federal Route 145 starts at Kampung Sungai Chukai. The Kilometre Zero of the Federal Route 146 starts at Kampung Panchur.

Features

At most sections, the Federal Route 145 and 146 was built under the JKR R5 road standard, with a speed limit of 90 km/h.

List of junctions

Kemaman Bypass

Teluk Kalung Bypass

References

Highways in Malaysia
Kemaman District
Malaysian Federal Roads